The Mayer Hirsch House in Alexandria, Louisiana was built around 1910.  It was added to the National Register of Historic Places on July 26, 1979.

It is Neo-Georgian in style.  It has a colossal portico, "easily the grandest portico of any turn-of-the-century house in the city".

See also 
Alexander State Forest

References

Houses on the National Register of Historic Places in Louisiana
Houses completed in 1910
Houses in Alexandria, Louisiana
National Register of Historic Places in Rapides Parish, Louisiana